This is a list of integration and measure theory topics, by Wikipedia page.

Intuitive foundations
Length
Area
Volume
Probability
Moving average

Riemann integral
Riemann sum
Riemann–Stieltjes integral
Bounded variation
Jordan content

Improper integrals
Cauchy principal value

Measure theory and the Lebesgue integral
Measure (mathematics)
Sigma algebra
Separable sigma algebra
Filtration (abstract algebra)
Borel algebra
Borel measure
Indicator function
Lebesgue measure
Lebesgue integration
Lebesgue's density theorem
Counting measure
Complete measure
Haar measure
Outer measure
Borel regular measure
Radon measure
Measurable function
Null set, negligible set
Almost everywhere, conull set
Lp space
Borel–Cantelli lemma
Lebesgue's monotone convergence theorem
Fatou's lemma
Absolutely continuous
Uniform absolute continuity
Total variation
Radon–Nikodym theorem
Fubini's theorem
Double integral
Vitali set, non-measurable set

Extensions
Henstock–Kurzweil integral
Amenable group
Banach–Tarski paradox
Hausdorff paradox

Integral equations
Fredholm equation
Fredholm operator
Liouville–Neumann series

Integral transforms
See also list of transforms, list of Fourier-related transforms
Kernel (integral operator)
Convolution
Radon transform

Integral geometry
Buffon's needle
Hadwiger's theorem
mean width
intrinsic volumes

Other
Stokes theorem
Differentiation under the integral sign
Contour integration
Examples of contour integration

See also
List of calculus topics
List of multivariable calculus topics
List of real analysis topics
List of integrals
List of integrals of exponential functions 
List of integrals of hyperbolic functions 
List of integrals of irrational functions 
List of integrals of logarithmic functions 
List of integrals of rational functions 
List of integrals of trigonometric functions
List of integrals of inverse trigonometric functions

Integration and measure theory topics